Draksharama is one of the five Pancharama Kshetras that are sacred to the Hindu god Siva. The temple is located in Draksharamam town of Konaseema district  in the Indian state of Andhra Pradesh. Bhimeswara Swamy refers to Lord Siva in this temple.

Etymology 
The town was formerly known as Dhakshatapovana and Dhakshavatika. This is the place where Daksha head of all prajapatis did a yagna or yajna called "Nireeswara yaga" or "Nireeswara yagna". This place's present name is a derivative of "Daksha aaraama" which means "Abode of Daksha". This place was also referred to as Daksha vaatika by Jagadguru Shankaracharya/ Adi Shankara in maha shakti peetha sloka at "Maanikye Daksha vaatika" which points to "Maanikyamba devi of Draksharama". The place where Daksha performed "Nireeswara yagna" is still visited by pilgrims here.

History of the temple
Inscriptions in the temple reveal that it was built between the 9th and 10th centuries CE by the Eastern Chalukyan king, Bhima. The big Mandapam of the temple was built by Ganga Mahadevi ,daughter-In-Law of Eastern Ganga Dynasty king Narasingha Deva I of Odisha.Architecturally and sculpturally, the temple reflects a blend of Chalukyan and Chola styles.

The temple is historically prominent. It was built by Eastern Chalukyas who reigned over this area. It's believed to have been constructed earlier to the Bhimeswaraswamy temple in SamarlaKota (Samalkot) that was built between 892 C.E. and 922 C.E.

Legend 
Daksharama is considered to be the place where Daksha Yagnam happened. Lord Siva sanctified the place after the rampage and carnage carried out at the place by Lord Veerabhadra.

Landmarks 
Bheemeswara Swami temple is a big temple which was renovated by eastern chalukyas. Temple has a pushkarini called "Sapta godavari" where sapta rishis brought waters from seven different rivers to create it. One can find saptarishis in a small mantapa located in sapta godavari pushkarini. One can visit kashi viswesara temple constructed by vyasa and agasthyeswara swami who was worshiped by sage Agasthya. There are few mantapas available in the temple compound too. You can find four gopurams around the temple and few temples like kala bhairava, veera bhadra and vatuka bhairava temples inside the temple premises.

Festivals 
Maha Siva Ratri and Dasara are the main festivals associated with Draksharama.

Transport 
Draksharamama is located at a distance of 25 km from Amalapuram, 28 km from Kakinada and 50 km from Rajahmundry. People can reach Rajahmundry and Kakinada by train and from there by road can reach Daksharamam. State highway connects it with all major towns and cities in India. Frequent bus services are available. The nearest airport is Rajahmundry Airport.

One can reach Draksharama by road, train and air.

Road: One can reach Rajahmundry and take a bus to Ramachandrapuram or One can reach Ravulapalem and take a bus to Ramachandrapuram. From Ramachandrapuram one should take Kotipalli or Yanam and other buses to reach Draksharama.

Train: One can reach Kakinada and take a train to Draksharama but there is only one rail bus running now and it won't run continuously.

Air: One can fly up to Rajahmundry and take a cab from airport to reach Draksharama in one and half hour.

See also 
Andhra Vishnu
Pancharama Kshetras

References

Hindu pilgrimage sites in India
Pancharama Kshetras
Archaeological sites in Andhra Pradesh